İqor Yevgenyeviç Getman (born 7 June 1971) is an Azerbaijani professional football coach and a former player.

Honours
 Azerbaijan Premier League winner: 1992, 2004, 2005.
 Azerbaijan Cup winner: 1999, 2004.

External links
 

1971 births
Living people
Soviet footballers
Azerbaijani footballers
Azerbaijani football managers
Azerbaijan international footballers
Azerbaijani expatriate footballers
Azerbaijan Premier League players
Footballers from Baku
Association football defenders
FC Anzhi Makhachkala players
Neftçi PFK players
FC Dynamo Stavropol players